Charles William "Whammy" Douglas (February 17, 1935 – November 16, 2014) was an American professional baseball player. Douglas was able to forge a professional career despite having lost an eye at age 11. Moreover, his blindness is what gave rise to Douglas's nickname (or at least the most enduring version thereof), his glass eye giving the appearance of an "evil eye," putting the "whammy" on opposing batters (an apparent allusion to "whammy"-wielding Hammond "Evil Eye" Fleegle, a supporting character in cartoonist Al Capp's syndicated Li'l Abner comic strip).

Career
Although Douglas only played part of one season in Major League Baseball out of his ten-year pro career, he had a measure of success for the 1957 Pittsburgh Pirates, appearing in 11 games (eight as a starting pitcher), and posting a 3.26 earned run average. In 47 innings pitched, he allowed 48 hits and 30 bases on balls, with 28 strikeouts. That season, the pitcher also played a supporting role in what has become a famous instance of umpire-baiting by controversial manager Bobby Bragan, when, on July 31, following a disputed call favoring the visiting Milwaukee Braves, Douglas slipped into the stands to purchase the orange drink with which Bragan then confronted the umpires.  

Douglas also was part of a major trade between the Pirates and the Cincinnati Reds in January 1959. Douglas was sent to Cincinnati in a package of players headlined by Pittsburgh slugger Frank Thomas. In return, the Bucs received Smoky Burgess, Harvey Haddix and Don Hoak — and that trio would play integral roles in the Pirates' 1960 world championship season.
Douglas never appeared in an MLB game for the Reds. His minor league record of 82–57 (compiled from 1953 to 1961; 1965) included a stellar season with the 1954 Brunswick Pirates of the Class D Georgia–Florida League, in which he won 27 games, lost only six and posted a 2.06 ERA. In the months immediately preceding that season, the winter of 1953–54, Douglas earned extra money playing semi-pro basketball.

Notes

References

Further reading
 Times-News Staff (June 7, 1952). "Graham Defeats Burlington, 5-1; Legion Clubs at Stadium Tonight; Mound Duel Is Feature of Contest; Douglas Fans 17". The Burlington Times-News.
 Johns, Walter L. (March 3, 1955). "Whammy Douglas Has Only One Eye But It is Focused on Baseball". The Evening Independent (Massilon, OH).
 AP Wirephoto (September 11, 1957). "Whammy Puts One on Braves' Hazle". The Des Moines Register.
 Burick, Si (March 15, 1959). "Douglas Does Double Duty". Dayton Daily News.
 Smith, Lou (March 23, 1959). "Lou Smith's Reds Scrapbook". The Cincinnati Enquirer.
 Hunter, Bill (April 8, 1965). "Wham Douglas Out of Baseball, Back 'Home' at Saxapahaw". The Burlington Times-News.
 Keidan, Bruce (April 2, 1983). "Screwball Pitch for $500 is fouled away by Tanner". Pittsburgh Post-Gazette. p. 17, 18
 Czerwinski, Kevin T. (July 30, 2008). "'Whammy' racked up wins with one eye". MiLB.com.
 Howlett, Dylan (October 1, 2014). "With one eye, Douglas saw more than most during eclectic baseball career". The Carrboro Commons.

External links

1935 births
2014 deaths
American expatriate baseball players in Mexico
Baseball players from North Carolina
American men's basketball players
Brunswick Pirates players
Burlington-Graham Pirates players
Burlington Senators players
Columbus Jets players
Havana Sugar Kings players
Macon Peaches players
Major League Baseball pitchers
Mexican League baseball pitchers
Nashville Vols players
New Orleans Pelicans (baseball) players
People from Carrboro, North Carolina
Pittsburgh Pirates players
Tigres del México players
Williamsport Grays players
Baseball players with disabilities
Sportspeople with a vision impairment